The Lilybaeum stele is a notable Phoenician gravestone stele found in Sicily and first published in 1882.

Its significance was described by Georges Perrot and Charles Chipiez in 1885:
...the chief interest of the monument lies in the bas-relief on its upper part. In the middle of the field stands one of those candelabra of which we have already given examples taken from Carthaginian steles; to the left is the sacred cone, here represented with head and arms as on the coins of certain Asiatic towns; near the cone stands a caduceus, on the right there is a man adoring. He is dressed in a robe falling to the feet and gathered in a band about the waist; a pointed cap is on his head. The whole thing is without value as a work of art, but it gives a good idea of the Phoenician costume, a costume which resembles that still worn in the Levant by those Greek, Syrian, and Armenian merchants who have not yet adopted the 
costume of Europe.

It was published in the Corpus Inscriptionum Semiticarum, having been supplied to Renan by Count Francesco Hernandez di Carrera.

The stele measures 0.37 x 0.22 m and is made from white calcareous stone.
 
It was found in Marsala (Roman Lilybaeum), in an area known as il Timpone di S. Antonio

The inscription is a standard Punic inscription, similar to those found on Carthaginian tombstones. It is a dedication to Baal Hammon by Hanno, son of Adonbaal.

It is currently in the Antonino Salinas Regional Archeological Museum in Palermo.

It is also known as KAI 63 and CIS I 138.

Notes

1882 archaeological discoveries
Phoenician inscriptions
Archaeological artifacts
KAI inscriptions
Phoenician steles